Appellhofplatz is an underground station and hub on the Cologne Stadtbahn lines 3, 4, 5, 16 and 18 in Cologne. More precisely, the station actually consists of two stations some 100 metres apart: Appellhofplatz/Zeughaus (for line 5) and Appellhofplatz/Breite Straße (for all other lines). The station is named after Appellhofplatz and lies in the district of Innenstadt.

History and Layout 
The station was opened in 1968 and 1969 and consists of a mezzanine and two platform levels with four side platforms and four rail tracks. Between the two parts of the station there is a triangular intersection, connecting the tunnels to Neumarkt, Friesenplatz and Dom/Hbf. Only the crossing in the tunnel to Friesenplatz is grade-separated, while the two others are at-grade - conversely, the crossing to Friesenplatz is the least frequented with just 36 trains per hour, while the other two serve 60 and 48 trains per hour. This design decision was taken, because the line to Friesenplatz replaced an existing highly frequented surface line, while the demand on the completely new line to Neumarkt was not expected to be as high. With the construction of the North-South Stadtbahn, line 16 will be rerouted to its own tunnel, resulting in only 36 and 48 trains using the crossings to Dom/Hbf and Neumarkt respectively, which will lead to fewer delays on this congested part of the network.

Notable places nearby 
 Zeughaus and Kölnisches Stadtmuseum
 St. Maria in der Kupfergasse
 EL-DE Haus
 Breite Straße, shopping district
 4711 House
 Cologne Opera

See also 
 List of Cologne KVB stations

References

External links 
 
 station info page 
 station layout diagram 

Cologne KVB stations
Innenstadt, Cologne
Railway stations in Germany opened in 1968
Cologne-Bonn Stadtbahn stations